Christian McNeish (born 8 April 1997) is a British taekwondo practitioner. He won the bronze medal at the 2014 Youth Olympic Games in the minus 63kg weight category.

References

British male taekwondo practitioners
Living people
1997 births
Taekwondo practitioners at the 2014 Summer Youth Olympics
Universiade medalists in taekwondo
Universiade bronze medalists for Great Britain
European Taekwondo Championships medalists
Medalists at the 2015 Summer Universiade
21st-century British people